Saint-Pierre-le-Viger is a commune in the Seine-Maritime department in the Normandy region in northern France.

Geography

Population

Places of interest
 The church of St. Joseph-Benoît Cottolengo, built in 1958, after the destruction of most of the village during 1944.
 The sixteenth century manorhouse.

See also
Communes of the Seine-Maritime department

References

Communes of Seine-Maritime